The Telecommunication Tower Lohmar-Birk is a  telecommunication tower built of reinforced concrete located in Lohmar, North Rhine-Westphalia, Germany. The Telecommunication Tower Lohmar-Birk serves as transmission tower for mobile phone services, directional radio services and as amateur radio relay.

External links
https://web.archive.org/web/20060527102742/http://fotos-n.breloehr.de/su/l-birk.htm

See also
List of towers

Communication towers in Germany
Buildings and structures in North Rhine-Westphalia